Nemacheilus saravacensis is a species of ray-finned fish in the genus Nemacheilus from western Borneo.

Footnotes 
 

S
Fish described in 1894